Alfred Mahlau (21 June 1894 – 22 January 1967) German painter, illustrator and teacher.

Biography 
Alfred Mahlau was born in Berlin on 21 June 1894.  He was best known for his graphical work and illustrations, and for the large stained glass window, Dance of Death, in the Lübeck Marienkirche (St. Mary's Church in Lübeck), which paid homage to a famous mural of the Dance of Death in the church that was destroyed in the bombing of Lübeck during World War II.  His books include a number of works with paintings and drawings of Hamburg and the Hamburg port. The product design for Niederegger from the twenties is still in use.

He died in Hamburg on 22 January 1967.

Among his students were Horst Janssen and Vicco von Bülow. His work is collected by the Busch-Reisinger Museum, among others.

References 

1894 births
1967 deaths
Artists from Berlin
20th-century German painters
20th-century German male artists
German male painters
German graphic designers
German illustrators
Stained glass artists and manufacturers